Degner is a surname. Notable people with the surname include:

Betty Degner, American baseball player
Ernst Degner (1931–1983), German motorcycle road racer

See also
Degener
Deger
Denner

German-language surnames
Surnames from given names